Bogia labronica is a species of sea snail, a marine gastropod mollusk in the family Lepetellidae.

Distribution
This species occurs in the Mediterranean Sea.

References

Lepetellidae
Gastropods described in 1984